The 2012 CAF Champions League (also known as the 2012 Orange CAF Champions League for sponsorship reasons) was the 48th edition of Africa's premier club football tournament organized by the Confederation of African Football (CAF), and the 16th edition under the current CAF Champions League format.

Al-Ahly from Egypt won a record seventh title, defeating Espérance ST from Tunisia with a 3–2 win on aggregate in the final. They qualified for the 2012 FIFA Club World Cup, and also earned the right to play in the 2013 CAF Super Cup.

Association team allocation
Theoretically, up to 55 CAF member associations may enter the 2012 CAF Champions League, with the 12 highest ranked associations according to CAF 5-Year Ranking eligible to enter 2 teams in the competition. For this year's competition, CAF used 2006-10 5-Year ranking. As a result, a maximum of 67 teams could enter the tournament – although this level has never been reached.

Ranking system

CAF calculates points for each entrant association based on their clubs’ performance over the last 5 years in the CAF Champions League and CAF Confederation Cup, not taking into considering the running year. The criteria for points are the following:

The points are multiplied by a coefficient according to the year as follow:
2010 – 5
2009 – 4
2008 – 3
2007 – 2
2006 – 1

Entrants list
Below is the entrants list for the competition. Nations are shown according to their 2006–2010 CAF 5-Year Ranking – those with a ranking score have their rank and score indicated. Teams were also seeded using their individual 2007–2011 5-Year team Ranking. The top thirteen sides (shown in bold) received byes to the first qualifying round.

Notes
Associations that did not enter a team: Libya (seeded 10th with 16 ranking points and entitled to two entrants), Botswana, Cape Verde, Djibouti, Eritrea, Guinea-Bissau, Malawi, Mauritania, Mauritius, Namibia, Réunion, São Tomé and Príncipe, Seychelles, Somalia, Togo
† According to the formula for calculating the CAF 5-Year Ranking, Angola, Ivory Coast and Zambia are tied 12th place with 13 ranking points. As stated in local media reports, Ivory Coast have two entrants, while Angola and Zambia have one entrant.
Unranked associations have no ranking points and hence are equal 19th.
Unranked teams have no rankings points and hence are equal 18th.  Club ranking is determined only between teams qualified for the 2012 CAF Champions League.

Round and draw dates
Schedule of dates for 2012 competition.

† Moved from original date of 9–11 November.

Qualifying rounds

The fixtures for the preliminary, first and second qualifying rounds were announced on 9 December 2011.

Qualification ties were decided over two legs, with aggregate goals used to determine the winner. If the sides were level on aggregate after the second leg, the away goals rule was applied, and if still level, the tie proceeded directly to a penalty shootout (no extra time was played).

Preliminary round

|}

First round

|}
Notes
Note 1: Djoliba advanced to the second round after being awarded the tie by CAF, as URA did not travel to Mali for the second leg due to the Malian crisis.

Second round

|}

The losing teams from the second round advanced to the 2012 CAF Confederation Cup play-off round.

Group stage

The draw for the group stage was held on 15 May 2012. The eight teams were seeded into four pots (using their individual 2007–2011 5-Year team Ranking). Each group contained one team from each pot. The matchdays were 6–8 July, 20–22 July, 3–5 August, 17–19 August, 31 August–2 September, and 14–16 September.

Group A

Group B

Knock-out stage

Bracket

Semifinals

|}

Final

Top scorers

See also
2012 CAF Confederation Cup
2013 CAF Super Cup

References

External links
CAF Champions League

 
2012
1